Bryolymnia viridimedia is a moth of the family Noctuidae first described by John Bernhardt Smith in 1905. It is found from south-eastern Arizona (Huachuca and Santa Rita Mountains) southward in the Sierra Madre Occidental to the Mexico City area.

The wingspan is about 36 mm. Adults have been collected from early July to mid-September.

External links

Hadeninae
Moths described in 1905
Moths of North America